So Tae-song (born 10 September 1990) is a North Korean footballer who plays as a forward.

References

Living people
North Korean footballers
North Korea international footballers
1990 births
Association football forwards